Pick (formerly Sky 3 and Pick TV) is a British free-to-air television channel, owned by Sky UK.

History
Sky Three launched on 31st October 2005. It was essentially a barker channel for Sky's main entertainment channel Sky One and its other subscription services, which served to "offer digital terrestrial viewers the opportunity to enjoy a wide variety of popular programmes from Sky". From its launch on 31 October 2005 until 24 June 2010, the channel carried Sky Travel's commercial presentations selling holiday deals for a number of providers.

Early highlights from the channel's schedule included Futurama, Cold Case, Tru Calling, Relic Hunter, Road Wars, the Inside strand of documentaries, Brainiac: Science Abuse, Airline, and 35mm from Sky Movies (which looks at upcoming films in the cinema and on Sky's premium movies service Sky Movies) and Dream Team. The channel has also shown the free-to-air premieres of some of Sky One's more prestigious shows such as series 3 and 4 of 24, Rescue Me, The 10th Kingdom, Hex and the latest remake of Battlestar Galactica. The channel also showed seasons 3 and 4 of Prison Break in 2010. Star Trek: Deep Space Nine and Star Trek: The Next Generation 

Since its rebrand to Pick TV in February 2011, recent Sky One shows such as UK Border Force, Pineapple Dance Studios and documentary series hosted by Ross Kemp such as On Gangs and In Search of Pirates were shown. In recent years, Sky has spent more on the channel, with an increased focus on airing Sky Showcase and Sky Witness programmes 12–18 months after their original broadcasts, and content tailored towards Pick.

On 1 February 2011, Sky Atlantic launched on Sky channel 108, which had originally been occupied by Sky 3. Sky 3 was renamed Pick TV on 1 March 2011, to dissassociate the channel with Sky as it began to air more programmes from the former Channel One and Bravo. On Monday 7 October 2013, Pick TV became Pick introducing a new look and logo for the channel. On 28 June 2016, another new logo was announced which also included a brand new look.

In May 2012, Pick TV started broadcasting some older Sky One and Sky Living shows, and the former Channel One and Bravo shows.

Between June and July 2020, when the Premier League resumed after lockdown, all of the remaining matches were televised due to fans not being allowed in the stadiums. 25 of these matches were televised on Pick, branded as "Sky Pick" for marketing purposes.

Logos

Availability

Cable
Virgin Media : Channel 156

Online
FilmOn: Pick TV
Sky Go: Pick TV

Satellite
Freesat : Channel 144
Sky  and Sky : Channel 151

Terrestrial
Freeview : Channel 36

Freeview and rebrands
Sky Three was the first free-to-air general entertainment channel from Sky since Sky One became a pay channel in 1993. It launched on 31 October 2005, replacing the Sky Travel's EPG slot on Freeview in a bid to attract more subscribers to Sky's satellite service. Due to its wider availability on Freeview channel 11, the channel constantly had higher ratings than Sky Two where Sky Three was achieving on average a 1% share compared to Sky Two's 0.1–3% share. Instead of Sky selling on the terrestrial free-to-air rights for their programmes to another broadcaster, these rights are usually retained to remain exclusive to Sky. In 2008, Sky's entertainment channels changed the wording in the logos to numbers, hence Sky Three became Sky 3.

On 23 August 2010, Sky Sports News became a pay-TV channel, which was replaced on Freeview by a one-hour timeshift version of Sky 3. Sky 3 +1 also launched on Sky channel 223 on the same day. A final rebrand took place in early 2011 and saw Sky 1, 2 and 3 gain similar rectangular logos to Sky News and Sky Sports.

The channel was rebranded as Pick TV (and Pick TV +1) on 28 February 2011. Only the name was changed, as the channel retained the look of the most recent rebrand which occurred a few weeks earlier. Sky's acquisition of Challenge saw quiz and gameshow type programming move off Pick TV. On 20 September 2011 at 14:00, Pick TV +1 was removed from Freeview. This was so that all of the channels owned by BSkyB could be on multiplex C and Challenge could broadcast for 24 hours a day in Wales on the platform, in-line with the rest of the UK. On 1 March 2018, Pick +1 was added back on Freeview as a FreeviewHD service. A while later the channel moved from channel 97 to 92 on Freeview.

Since its rebrand to Pick, it is fairly common for Pick and Challenge to cross-promote its programmes to viewers. These include regular trailers in between shows, and when a certain show finishes, the continuity announcer will usually tell viewers what is coming up next on both channels.

On 18 June 2020, Pick +1 was removed from Freeview channel 92.

On 17 September 2020, Pick moved from channel 11 on Freeview to channel 34 to make way for Sky Arts which moved to Freeview, which replaced Merit on the platform. On 4 November 2020, the channel moved to channel 35 as part of a move up where every channel from channel 24 to 54 on the platform moved up one place to allow BBC Four to move to channel 24 in Scotland due to new Ofcom rules regarding certain PSB channels requiring greater prominence on EPGs. This is because the BBC Scotland channel is on channel 9 in Scotland, whilst BBC4 is on channel 9 in the rest of the UK.

References

2005 establishments in the United Kingdom
English-language television stations in the United Kingdom
Sky television channels
Television channels and stations established in 2005
Television channels in the United Kingdom